Venu Thottempudi (born 4 June 1976) is an Indian actor who primarily works in Telugu cinema. He has appeared in several successful Telugu films as a lead actor.

Career
After finishing his engineering from Dharwad Engineering College, Venu started pursuing acting as his career. For his first acting job, he was cast as the main lead in a movie directed by Bharathiraja. After a brief period of shooting, the movie was stalled and later cancelled due to production problems.  To promote Venu, his friend Venkata Shyamprasad formed S. P. Entertainments. Under this banner, in 1999 Venu started his career with the movie Swayamvaram, directed by K. Vijaya Bhaskar. Co-starring Laya, the movie was very successful at the box-office and Venu won a Nandi Special Jury Award for the movie. Venu became well known for his dialogue delivery, timing, expressions and clear portrayal of emotions. In 2000, Venu won at the boxoffice once again with Chiru Navvutho. G. Ramprasad, who earlier worked with B. Gopal as an assistant director, was roped in as the director for this movie. This movie co-starring Shaheen Khan was produced once again by S. P. Entertainments. Chiru Navvutho became one of the most successful Telugu movie in the year 2000 and received acclaim for Trivikram Srinivas's writing and Venu's performance as a chef whose marriage gets cancelled due to elopement of the bride.

After a couple of successful films, Venu received several offers. Later he appeared in a few unsuccessful films like Manasu Paddanu Kaani directed by Veeru and Veedekkadi Mogudandi? directed by E. V. V. Satyanarayana. He later bounced back with a couple of hits like Hanuman Junction directed by M. Raja and Pellam Oorelithe directed by S. V. Krishna Reddy. In 2003, his movie Kalyana Ramudu, co-starring Prabhu Deva and Nikita Thukral, was directed by G. Ram Prasad. He also starred in Cheppave Chirugali, directed by noted Tamil director, Vikraman. His next releases were Sadaa Mee Sevalo (2005) directed by Neelakanta, Bahumati directed by S. V. Krishna Reddy and Allare Allari directed by Muppalaneni Siva.

In 2007, his movie Yamagola Malli Modalayindi co-starring Srikanth, Meera Jasmine and Reemma Sen was released. This movie was successful at the box-office. In 2008, he was seen in a small yet vital role in the movie Chintakayala Ravi starring Venkatesh. In 2009 he was seen in Gopi Gopika Godavari directed by Vamsy and co-starring Kamalinee Mukherjee. In 2011, Venu was seen in Dileep Polan's Mayagadu opposite Charmy Kaur. His next release was titled Ramachari and directed by Eshawar. He is paired with Kamalinee Mukherjee in this movie. Venu was also seen in N. T. Rama Rao Jr.'s movie Dammu, directed by Boyapati Srinu. After 9 years Venu will be Seen in Ravi Teja's movie Ramarao on Duty, directed by Sarath Mandava.

Filmography

Awards and nominations

References

External links

Living people
Telugu male actors
Indian male film actors
Male actors from Hyderabad, India
1976 births
Telugu comedians
Indian male comedians
Male actors in Telugu cinema
21st-century Indian male actors